The imperial election of 1273 was an imperial election held to select the emperor of the Holy Roman Empire. It took place in Frankfurt on October 1.

Background 
The Holy Roman Empire was in the midst of a period known as the Great Interregnum.  In July 1245, the Pope Innocent IV had declared the then emperor, Frederick II, Holy Roman Emperor, deposed, opening a split between two factions, the Guelphs and Ghibellines.

The previous King of the Romans, Richard, 1st Earl of Cornwall, died on April 2, 1272 in Berkhamsted following a stroke he had suffered in December 1271. The seven prince-electors called to Frankfurt were:

 Archbishop , Elector of Mainz
 Archbishop , Elector of Cologne
 Archbishop , Elector of Trier
 Louis II, Elector Palatine
 John and Albert II, co-dukes of Saxony as Saxon elector
 Otto V, Margrave of Brandenburg-Salzwedel
 Ottokar II, King of Bohemia and "usurper" duke of Austria

To Frankfurt arrived the three archbishops, Elector Louis and
 Albert of Saxony also as representative of his brother
 Frederick III of Nuremberg as representative for Margraviate of Brandenburg
However, strictly speaking, Ottokar's marriage with the heiress of the Arch-Pincerna dynasty had already ended in annulment, Ottokar was holding as usurper her duchies the Carantanian territories, duchy of Styria and Austria. King Ottokar II did not arrive.
The six electors convened on 29 September and summoned the Bavarian Duke to exercise the Carantanian-Bavarian vote instead of the absent King Ottokar  or anyone else better entitled to it.

There were 4 candidates: the favourites Rudolf, Count of Habsburg and Ottakar II of Bohemia (an elector himself), and lesser candidates Siegfried I, Prince of Anhalt and Frederick I, Margrave of Meissen.

Election and aftermath
Count Rudolf was elected without opposition after Henry XIII, Duke of Bavaria's promotion to elector instead Ottakar II. Rudolf's principal voters, Albert II of Saxony and Louis II of Palatinate, were assured by marrying his daughters to the two electors. He was crowned at Aachen Cathedral on October 24.

Rudolf was the first member of the House of Habsburg to rule the Holy Roman Empire.  The house would occupy the seat continuously from 1438 to 1740 and produce emperors and kings of Bohemia, England, Germany, Hungary, Croatia, Mexico, Ireland, Portugal and Spain, as well as rulers of several Dutch and Italian principalities.

References

1273
1273 in Europe
Non-partisan elections